The Syracuse Orange football team competes as part of the NCAA Division I Football Bowl Subdivision (FBS), representing Syracuse University in the Atlantic Division of the Atlantic Coast Conference (ACC). Since the establishment of the team in 1890, Syracuse has appeared in 27 bowl games. Included in these games are 7 combined appearances in the traditional "big four" bowl games (the Rose, Sugar, Cotton, and Orange) and 1 Bowl Championship Series (BCS) game appearances. The latest bowl appearance for Syracuse was a loss to Minnesota in the 2022 Pinstripe Bowl. This took Syracuse's all-time bowl record to 16 wins, ten losses and one tie (16–10–1).

In addition to the bowls listed below, Syracuse also declined an invitation to the 1915 Rose Bowl due to an earlier trip to the West Coast.

Bowl games

Notes

References
General

Specific

Syracuse Orange

Football bowl games
Syracuse Orange bowl games